The first lady of Florida is the title held by the hostess of the Florida Governor's Mansion, usually the spouse of the governor of Florida, concurrent with the governor's term in office.

Casey DeSantis is the current first lady of Florida, assuming the position on January 8, 2019, as the wife of 46th and current Florida governor Ron DeSantis, with whom she has three children.

Rhoda Elizabeth Waller Gibbes, the mother of Florida governor Albert Gilchrist, served as first lady of Florida from 1909 to 1912, and pushed for a monument to the American Civil War Battle of Olustee.

In 2019, Casey DeSantis established the First Lady's Medal for Courage, Commitment, and Service.

First ladies of Florida
Casey DeSantis (2019–present)
Ann Scott (2011–2019)
Carole Crist (2008–2011)
Columba Bush (1999–2007)
Rhea Chiles (1991–1998)
Margie Mixson (1987)
Adele Khoury Graham (1979–1987)
Donna Lou Harper Askew (1971–1978)
Erika Mattfeld Kirk (1967–1970)
Mildred Carlyon Burns (1965–1967)
Julia Burnett Bryant (1961–1964)
Mary Call Darby Collins (1955–1960)
Thelma Brinson Johns (September 28, 1953 – 1954)
Olie Brown McCarty (1953–September 28, 1953)
Barbara Manning Warren (1949–1952)
Mary Rebecca Harwood Caldwell (1945–1949)
Mary Agnes Groover Holland (1941–1944)
Mildred Victoria Thompson Cone (1937–1942)
Alice May Agee Sholtz (1933–1936)
Nell Ray Carlton (1929–1932)
Lottie Wilt Pepper Martin (1925–1928)
Maude Randell Hardee (1921–1925)
Alice May Campbell Catts (1917–1920)
Virginia Darby Trammel (1913–1916)
Rhoda Elizabeth Waller Gibbes, mother of governor Albert Gilchrist who was a bachelor (1909–1912)
Annie Isabell Douglass (1905–1908)
May Mann Jennings (1901–1904)
Mary C. Davis Bloxham (1897–1900)
Mary Eugenia Spencer Mitchell (1893–1896)
Floride Lydia Pearson Fleming (1889–1892)
Wathen Herbert Taylor Perry (1885–1888)
Mary C. Davis Bloxham (1881–1884)
Ameila Dickens Drew (1877–1881)
Marcellus Lovejoy Stearns was a bachelor (March 1874 – 1876)
Catherine Smith Campbell Hart (1873–March 18, 1874)
Chloe Merrick Reed (1868–1872)
Philoclea Alson Walker (December 20, 1865 – July 4, 1868)
Harriett Newell Marvin (July 13, 1865 – December 20, 1865)
Elizabeth S. Coleman Allison (April 1, 1865 – May 19, 1865)
Caroline Howze Milton (October 7, 1861 – April 1, 1865)
Martha Starke Peay Perry (October 5, 1857 – October 7, 1861)
Mary M. Scott Broome (October 3, 1853 – October 5, 1857)
Elizabeth Simpson Brown (October 1, 1849 – October 3, 1853)
William Dunn Moseley was a widower (June 25, 1845 – October 1, 1849)

Territorial period
Elizabeth Foort Branch (August 11, 1844 – June 25, 1845)
Mary Letitia Kirkman Call (March 19, 1841 – August 11, 1844)
Mary Marth Smith Reid (December 2, 1839 – March 19, 1841)
Mary Letitia Kirkman Call (March 16, 1836 – December 2, 1839)
Peggy O'Neale Timberlake Eaton (April 24, 1834 – March 16, 1836)
Nancy Hines Duval (April 17, 1822 – April 24, 1834)
Rachel Donelson Jackson (March 10, 1821 – November 12, 1821)

Gallery

See also
List of current United States first spouses

References

Lists of people from Florida
Year of birth missing (living people)
Living people